"The Adventure of the Beryl Coronet", one of the 56 short Sherlock Holmes stories written by Sir Arthur Conan Doyle, is the eleventh of the twelve stories collected in The Adventures of Sherlock Holmes. The story was first published in The Strand Magazine in May 1892.

Plot

A banker, Mr. Alexander Holder of Streatham, makes a loan of £50,000 (equivalent to approximately £ in ) to a socially prominent client, who leaves a beryl coronet—one of the most valuable public possessions in existence—as collateral. Holder feels that he must not leave this rare and precious piece of jewellery in his personal safe at the bank, and so he takes it home with him to lock it up there. He is awakened in the night by a noise, enters his dressing room, and is horrified to see his son Arthur with the coronet in his hands, apparently trying to bend it. Holder's niece Mary comes at the sound of all the shouting and, seeing the damaged coronet, faints dead away. Three beryls are missing from it.  In a panic, Mr. Holder travels to see Holmes, who agrees to take the case.

The case against Arthur seems rather damning, yet Holmes is not convinced of his guilt. Why is Arthur refusing to give a statement of any kind? How could Arthur have broken the coronet (even Holmes, who has exceptionally strong hands, can barely do it) and without making any noise? Could any other people in the household be involved, such as the servants, or Mary? Could some visitor, such as the maid's wooden-legged suitor, or Arthur's rakish friend Sir George Burnwell, have something to do with what happened to the coronet? The failure to resolve the case will result in Mr Holder's dishonour, and a national scandal.

Holmes sets about not only reviewing the details that he learns from Holder but also by examining the footprints in the snow outside. Eventually, Holmes solves the mystery, and Holder is flabbergasted to find that his niece was in league with a notorious criminal (Sir George Burnwell), although apparently, she is unaware of his character. The two of them escape justice; however, Holmes is convinced that they will receive their punishment in due time. Arthur's motive in allowing his father to think he was the thief was that he was in love with his cousin Mary and saw her passing the coronet to Burnwell outside the window. (The coronet was broken when Arthur was struggling to wrench it from Burnwell's grasp.) Holmes regains the jewels after threatening Sir George at gunpoint with an offer of £1,000 apiece (for each of the 3 beryls); Burnwell is shocked at Holmes' offer—he had already sold them to a fence for £600. With the additional offer of no prosecution, Holmes buys the beryls from the fence for £3,000; Holmes receives £4,000 compensation but sternly scolds Holder that he owes his son an apology for erroneously assuming Arthur had stolen the coronet.

Publication history
"The Adventure of the Beryl Coronet" was first published in the UK in The Strand Magazine in May 1892, and in the United States in the US edition of the Strand in June 1892. The story was published with nine illustrations by Sidney Paget in The Strand Magazine. It was included in the short story collection The Adventures of Sherlock Holmes, which was published in October 1892.

Adaptations

Film and television
The 1912 short film The Beryl Coronet was released in the Éclair film series featuring Georges Tréville as Sherlock Holmes.

The story was dramatised as a 1921 silent short film as part of the Stoll film series starring Eille Norwood as Holmes.

The story was adapted for an episode of the 1965 television series Sherlock Holmes with Douglas Wilmer as Holmes, Nigel Stock as Watson, Leonard Sachs as Holder and Suzan Farmer as Mary. It also featured David Burke as Sir George Burnwell. Burke would later play Watson opposite Jeremy Brett in the first two seasons of The Adventures of Sherlock Holmes.

A 2001 episode of the animated television series Sherlock Holmes in the 22nd Century, titled "The Adventure of the Beryl Board", was based on the story.

The story was used in part in the Elementary episode 'How the Sausage Is Made.'

Radio
Edith Meiser adapted the story as an episode of the radio series The Adventures of Sherlock Holmes which aired on 28 January 1932, with Richard Gordon as Sherlock Holmes and Leigh Lovell as Dr Watson. Other episodes adapted from the story aired on 24 March 1935 (with Louis Hector as Holmes and Lovell as Watson) and 26 September 1936 (with Gordon as Holmes and Harry West as Watson).

A dramatisation of "The Beryl Coronet" was broadcast on the BBC Light Programme on 30 June 1959, as part of the 1952–1969 radio series starring Carleton Hobbs as Holmes and Norman Shelley as Watson. The cast also included Frederick Treves as Arthur Holder and Ronald Baddiley as Roberts. It was adapted by Michael Hardwick.

"The Adventure of the Beryl Coronet" was dramatised as a 1977 episode of the series CBS Radio Mystery Theater with Kevin McCarthy as Sherlock Holmes and Court Benson as Dr. Watson.

The story was adapted by Vincent McInerney for BBC Radio 4 in 1991 as an episode of the 1989–1998 radio series starring Clive Merrison as Holmes and Michael Williams as Watson. It featured Anthony Newlands as Holder, Angus Wright as Arthur, Petra Markham as Mary, and Timothy Carlton (father of Benedict Cumberbatch, another famous Sherlock) as Sir George Burnwell.

A 2010 episode of the radio series The Classic Adventures of Sherlock Holmes was adapted from the story, with John Patrick Lowrie as Holmes and Lawrence Albert as Watson.

Radio MirchiBangla adapted this story for their Sunday Suspense series on 12 September 2021.
Mir enacted as Sherlock Holmes and Deep enacted the role of Dr. Watson.

Print
The novel The Further Adventures of Sherlock Holmes: The Improbable Prisoner by Stuart Douglas is a subtle 'sequel' to this story.

References
Notes

Sources

External links

Beryl Coronet, The Adventure of the
1892 short stories
Short stories adapted into films
Works originally published in The Strand Magazine